Twin Lakes Airport  was a public use airport located 15 nm north of Andros Central, the Bahamas.  The airport is closed.

See also
List of airports in the Bahamas

References

External links 
 Central Airport record for Twin Lakes Airport at Landings.com

Defunct airports
Airports in the Bahamas